John Pole Mayo (12 August 1822 — 23 March 1899) was an English first-class cricketer and British Army officer.

Mayo was born in August 1822 at Tankurst Park near Wotton, Surrey. He made his debut in first-class cricket for Middlesex against Surrey at The Oval in 1850. Mayo played in a further five first-class matches in 1850 and 1851, all for the Marylebone Cricket Club, playing three against the varsity sides Oxford and Cambridge, as well as a match each against Middlesex and the Surrey Club. He scored 63 runs in his six first-class matches, with a highest score of 22. Besides playing first-class cricket, Mayo also served in the British Army, having purchased the rank of ensign in the 18th Regiment of Foot. He transferred to the 74th Regiment of Foot in June 1845, at which point he was promoted to lieutenant. Mayo was also a member of the Royal Geographical Society, being elected as a fellow in May 1858. Mayo died at Notting Hill in March 1899.

References

External links

1822 births
1899 deaths
People from Mole Valley (district)
English cricketers
Middlesex cricketers
Marylebone Cricket Club cricketers
Royal Irish Regiment (1684–1922) officers
74th Highlanders officers
Fellows of the Royal Geographical Society